James Thomson (20 February 1852 – 2 May 1890) was a New Zealand cricketer. He played two first-class matches for Otago in 1873/74.

See also
 List of Otago representative cricketers

References

External links
 

1852 births
1890 deaths
New Zealand cricketers
Otago cricketers
Cricketers from Edinburgh